Events from the year 1295 in Ireland.

Incumbent
Lord: Edward I

Events
 John Wogan was appointed Justiciar of Ireland
 Matthew M'Catasaid rebuilt St Macartan's Cathedral, Clogher
 Roscrea Castle, originally a wooden structure, was completed in stone

Births

Deaths
Domnall Mór Ua Briain, King of Thomond
Domnall Ó Cellaigh, King of Uí Maine and Chief of the Name

References

Draft for review